Vändra River is a river in Pärnu, Järva and Rapla County, Estonia. The river is 50.1 km long and basin size is 254.9 km². It runs into Pärnu River.

References

Rivers of Estonia
Pärnu County
Järva County
Rapla County